La melodía prohibida, translated into English in English reviews as Forbidden Melody, was a 1933 American Spanish language drama film directed by Frank Strayer, which stars José Mojica, Conchita Montenegro, and Mona Maris. The screenplay was written by Paul Perez and Enrique Jardiel Poncela, from a story by Eve Unsell. It was produced and distributed by Fox Films, which released it on September 13, 1933.

Cast list
 José Mojica as Kalu
 Conchita Montenegro as Tuila
 Mona Maris as Peggy
 Romualdo Tirado as Al Martin
 Juan Martínez Plá as Bob Grant
 Carmen Rodríguez as Tía Olivia
 Antonio Vidal as El gobernador
 Ralph Navarro as Tom Nichols
 Agostino Borgato as Win Ta Tu
 Soledad Jiménez as Fa Uma
 Charles Bancroft as Ricky Doyle

References

External links
 
 
 

1930s Spanish-language films
Spanish-language American films
1933 drama films
1933 films
American drama films
Fox Film films
Films directed by Frank R. Strayer
American black-and-white films
Films scored by Samuel Kaylin
1930s American films